Monduone N'Kama (born 23 July 1960) is a retired Zaire international footballer, who played as a forward.

Club career
Born in Kinshasa, N'Kama began his career with AS Vita Club. He moved to play in Portugal at the age of 25, signing with Vitória S.C. He would spend two seasons with Vitória playing in the Portuguese Liga and UEFA Cup, before moving to C.F. Estrela da Amadora, where he would only make two substitute appearances in a disappointing season. He finished his career in the Portuguese second division, playing for S.C. Covilhã and C.D. Olivais e Moscavide.

International career
N'Kama played for Zaire at the 1988 Africa Cup of Nations finals.

References

External links

1960 births
Living people
Footballers from Kinshasa
Democratic Republic of the Congo footballers
Democratic Republic of the Congo expatriate footballers
Democratic Republic of the Congo international footballers
1988 African Cup of Nations players
AS Vita Club players
Vitória S.C. players
C.F. Estrela da Amadora players
S.C. Covilhã players
C.D. Olivais e Moscavide players
Primeira Liga players
Expatriate footballers in Portugal
Democratic Republic of the Congo expatriate sportspeople in Portugal
Association football forwards